Wander Over Yonder is an American animated science fiction comedy television series created by Craig McCracken. It ran from August 16, 2013, to June 27, 2016. New episodes premiered on Disney Channel before being moved to Disney XD starting with the ninth episode. A total of 43 episodes (79 segments) were produced over the course of two seasons; an additional eleven shorts bridge the first and the second season.

Wander Over Yonder follows the eponymous character, Wander, and his best friend and steed Sylvia. An optimistic and adventurous traveler of the galaxies, Wander aims to help inhabitants of other planets live freely, against the intentions of Lord Hater to rule the universe. Each episode typically consists of two segments, each roughly eleven minutes in length. Several half-hour specials were also made throughout the series.

Series overview

Episodes

Season 1 (2013–14)
Episodes from this season are listed in production order, rather than the order in which they premiered. However, due to continuity purposes, episodes 16 and 18 are swapped.

Season 2 (2015–16)

Shorts (2015)
 Preceding the second season, 11 one-minute Wander shorts premiered on the Watch Disney XD app and on Disney XD's YouTube channel beginning July 20, 2015.

Notes

References

Wander over Yonder
Wander over Yonder
Wander Over Yonder